Rob and Romesh Vs… is a British light entertainment comedy television series made for Sky Television in which comedians Rob Beckett and Romesh Ranganathan meet people from the worlds of sport and entertainment. The show was first broadcast on Sky One (now Sky Max) in January 2019. Guests have included the England national football team, Andy Murray, and Usain Bolt. The Guardian described the show as “comedic guinea pigs Rob Beckett and Romesh Ranganathan continue to try their hands at learning new skills, coached by professionals”.

Episodes

Season One (2019)
Season one started broadcast on Friday 25th January 2019 on Sky One at 9pm.

 Episode 1. Usain Bolt (Original Air Date )

Episode 2. The NFL - Philadelphia Eagles (Original Air Date )

Episode 3. Fashion - David Gandy, Gok Wan (Original Air Date )

 Episode 4. DJs- DJ Yoda, Andy C, Chase and Status, Jonas Blue (Original Air Date )

Episode 5. Country Music - Shania Twain, Tyler Cain, Meghan Linsey (Original Air Date )

 Episode 6. Anthony Joshua, Tony Bellew (Original Air Date )

Season Two (2020)
Episode 7. Ballet (Original Air Date )

Episode 8. NBA Basketball (Original Air Date )

Episode 9. Cricket: South Africa: Kevin Pietersen (Original Air Date )

Episode 10. Cricket: The Test:Nasser Hussain, Darren Gough, Jack Leach, Jonny Bairstow, Neil Manthorp (Original Air Date )

Season Three (2021)
Episode 11. Art - Lachlan Goudie, Quilla Constance, Robin George (Original Air Date )

Episode 12. Golf - Justin Rose, Marcus Armitage (Original Air Date )

Episode 13. Drag - Alan Carr (Original Air Date )

 Episode 14. Andy Murray (Original Air Date )

 Episode 15. Team GB - part 1 (Original Air Date )

Episode 16. Team GB - part 2 Denise Lewis, Max Whitlock (Original Air Date )

Christmas Special (2021)
Episode 17. Christmas Special (Original Air Date

Season Four (2022) 
Episode 18. Strongman - Magnus Ver Magnusson (Original Air Date = )

Episode 19. West End Musicals (Original Air Date = )

Episode 20. Restaurants first course- Tom Kerridge (Original Air Date = )

Episode 21. Restaurants second course: Jay Rayner, Grace Dent (Original Air Date = )

World Cup Special (2022)
Episode. 22 3 Lions - Gareth Southgate, Harry Kane, Jude Bellingham, Kyle Walker, Mason Mount, Jordan Pickford (Original Air Date )

Production
The show is produced by CPL Productions. Rob Beckett told the Royal Television Society that the original idea was to pair him and a non-boxing fan to meet Anthony Joshua and Romesh was chosen as his friend who knew nothing about boxing with the two having met and befriended on the UK comedy circuit. Ranganathan explained that the original idea was just to cover sports “but it soon became clear that if we immense ourselves in any kind of world you’re always going to get something from it.” Beckett explained that they “commit to it. We don’t just fake it for telly. We’re not going through the motions.”

Reception
The show was nominated in the Entertainment Performance category at the 2021 Royal Television Society Programme Awards. The show was also nominated for best comedy entertainment series at the 2022 National Comedy Awards.

References

 2019 British television series debuts
English-language television shows
2010s British comedy television series
2020s British comedy television series